Karyn Dwyer (born Karyn Elizabeth Dwyer; 22 March 1975 – 25 September 2018) was a Canadian actress, whose best known role was as Maggie in the 1999 film Better Than Chocolate.

Early life
Dwyer was the oldest of five children, three sons and two daughters, born into an Irish Catholic family in Corner Brook, Newfoundland, Canada, on 22 March 1975, Her father died at the age of 38. Her brother died at the age of 24. All her brothers were named after the Boston Bruins: Brad (Park), Barry (Beck) and Paul (Hurley).

Dwyer studied acting with the Youth Theatre. She made her stage debut at the Arts and Culture Center at the age of 10, playing the title role in Theatre Newfoundland and Labrador's production of Alice in Wonderland and went on to become an accomplished child stage actress performing in various theatres throughout Newfoundland and Labrador. She also performed in her school productions, won awards for acting, public speaking, singing and instrumental performance and wrote for the school newspaper. She moved to Toronto, Ontario, to attend the George Brown Theatre School. Dwyer attended theatre school for one year and then began studying with David Rotenberg's on-camera acting class also in Toronto and later John Riven's Meisner.

Career
After moving to Toronto, Dwyer landed her first film role acting opposite David Cronenberg in the independent Canadian film Boozecan. She wrote and starred in her one-woman show Bad Girls at the Rivoli in Toronto. In 1994 she played Phoebe in As You Like It opposite Seana McKenna and Albert Schultz in the Du Maurier World Stage Theatre Festival.

In 1999 Dwyer starred as the 19-year-old Maggie in the lesbian-themed film Better Than Chocolate, winning the role over hundreds of others who auditioned in a cross Canada search. The film won numerous audience choice awards at film festivals all around the world, was ranked 31st on The Hollywood Reporter'''s Top 200 independent films list of 1999. It had one of Canada's highest international box office grosses and earn Dwyer a loyal cult following. Better Than Chocolate opened to rave reviews at both the Berlin Film Festival and the Vancouver International Film Festival. It was hailed by "Variety" as a terrifically entertaining romantic comedy. "The Hollywood Reporter" called Dwyer the film's heart and soul. Better Than Chocolate ranked 31 on "The Hollywood Reporter"'s list of best independent films. The "Chicago Tribune" review declared that the highlight of the movie is unquestionably Dwyer's performance as Maggie.

Also that year, Dwyer played Summer Falls in the bigger budget studio film Superstar, with Molly Shannon and Will Ferrell and produced by Lorne Michaels. Dwyer returned to the stage playing the title role in Native Earth's Romeo and Juliet, performance artist Sooze in Eric Bogosian's Suburbia and originated the role of Carrie, a junkie prostitute in the experimental play Exercises in Depravity, which featured R. H. Thomson.

She also starred in award-winning short films adapted from plays: Pony, adapted from White Biting Dog by playwright Judith Thompson; Dying Like Ophelia, adapted from Lion in the Streets also by playwright Judith Thompson; Polished, adapted from Polished by playwright James Harkness. In 2005, Dwyer reunited with her Better Than Chocolate director Anne Wheeler, guest starring in the awarding winning Canadian series This Is Wonderland. True to her roots, Dwyer returned to Newfoundland and Labrador, where she studied filmmaking at NIFCO, guest starred on Republic of Doyle, and shared her talent at For the Love of Learning, Inc'', a not-for-profit empowerment and creativity-based learning program, teaching theatre to Newfoundland and Labrador's youth to use their creativity to overcome social and / or economic obstacles. In 2006, Dwyer was voted one of the Top Ten Hottest Actresses and profiled as The Hottest Canadian on "The Hottest Canadian". She was also named a Newfoundland Entertainment Icon by "The Newfoundland Herald".

Death
Dwyer died on 25 September 2018 at the age of 43.

Filmography

Film

Television

References

External links
 
 
 	
 

Actresses from Newfoundland and Labrador
Canadian film actresses
Canadian television actresses
Canadian voice actresses
Canadian stage actresses
Canadian child actresses
Canadian people of Scottish descent
Canadian people of Irish descent
People from Corner Brook
People with mood disorders
1975 births
2018 deaths
20th-century Canadian actresses
21st-century Canadian actresses
2018 suicides